Oliver Thompson (born 2 January 1980) is a British strongman, mixed martial artist and former holder of the title Britain's Strongest Man. Thompson currently competes in the Heavyweight division, is a former UCMMA heavyweight champion, and has also previously competed for the UFC, KSW, and BAMMA.

Background
Born in East Sussex to a Northern Irish father and an English mother, Thompson grew up playing rugby union at English county level. He has stated his favourite thing about rugby was weight training. Thus, when he was 19 he joined Physiques gym in Bexhill-on-Sea, East Sussex and within a matter of weeks he had broken the gym record for dead-lifting with a 260 kg lift. This prompted him to start to focus more on a strict routine of weight and strength in order to become a strength athlete.He now lives happily with his wife and daughters.

Strongman career
Thompson's first competition was the 2001 UK's Strongest Man Qualifier. Although he did not qualify, he gained experience and remained focused on only competing in professional level events. In 2002 he won Kent's Strongest Man, taking first place in 5 out of 6 events. He went on to qualify in 2003 for Britain's Strongest Man ("BSM"), and in 2004 surpassed all expectations when he came third. This earned him the right to compete alongside the top strength athletes in the world at the Moscow Super Series 2004 (known as the 2004 Russia Grand Prix, although in 2004 this was not part of the WSM Super Series and again later in the year at Europe's Strongest Man in Poland).

In 2005 he opted to compete in the IFSA British Championships which was set up in direct rivalry with the BSM after IFSA parted company with the BSM and World's Strongest Man competition organiser TWI. He finished second in that competition to Mark Felix. Like many British strongmen he returned to the TWI British circuit in 2006 and won Britain's Strongest Man that year. He also competed in the 2006 IFSA World Championship where he made the final and came eighth. Disaster struck in February 2007, whilst he was training for the Mohegan Sun Super Series. He was deadlifting and he tore his biceps. Reportedly, he said that it did not hurt. He went on to say "No, there are no nerves in there, it didn’t hurt. I just heard it snap and I was just aware of it. You can feel it come up, but there’s no pain." Although the biceps was repaired Thompson has reported that it feels different and that "it’s just not quite as smooth." Although he has said that he does not think it will ever be the same, he has also said that: "When I get to a competition, I won’t be holding back because of my arm. I’ve already won Britain’s Strongest Man - you don’t want to go down - you’ve got to try and win Britain’s Strongest Man again or it’s pointless. So I’ve got to win it really. That’ll be how I judge where I go from there - if I win it or not. Second place isn’t something I’ll be chuffed with." Thompson trained intensively with training partner Scott Reid, the 2007 Britain's Strongest Man in the 105 kg weight class. He went on to qualify for the finals of Britain's Strongest Man in 2008 and won his heat in the process. However, the injury was too proximate for him to fully challenge for the title in a field that was widely reported to have been one of the strongest ever.

Thompson had been closely associated with IFSA in the past but states that he always did what he wanted to do. Prior to the BSM 2008 he stated that "If I don’t qualify for Britain’s Strongest Man I may well end up doing the IFSA World Championships.".

As well as Thompson's successful British Finals, he also won the South England Strongest Man Championship three times (2003, 2004 and 2006) and Sussex Strongest Man on three consecutive occasions from 2003 to 2005. He has also competed in a number of Grand Prix events in Dubai, Latvia, Hungary.

Mixed martial arts career
Oli Thompson made his mixed martial arts debut on 3 February 2009, defeating Ashley Pollard by a second round arm triangle choke. He has continued to fight since then, On 26 March 2011, after amassing a record of 7–2, with his only losses coming to future UFC Heavyweight Rob Broughton and former UFC fighter Joe Vedepo, Thompson took on defending UCMMA champion Ben Smith at UCMMA 19. Thompson won via second round rear naked choke, becoming the new UCMMA Heavyweight Champion. He then defended his title at UCMMA 21 - Stand Your Ground against boxer-turned mixed martial artist Mark Potter, again winning by rear naked choke, this time in the first round.

Ultimate Fighting Championship
Thompson signed with the Ultimate Fighting Championship and was expected to make his debut against Philip De Fries at UFC 138. However, Thompson was forced out of the bout with an injury and replaced by Rob Broughton.

Thompson made his official debut against UFC newcomer Shawn Jordan at UFC on FX 2. He lost the fight via TKO in the second round after a back-and-forth fight.

Thompson next fought Phil De Fries at UFC on FOX 4, in his second UFC outing. He lost via submission in the second round and was subsequently released from the promotion.

BAMMA
Thompson headlined BAMMA 15 against Albanian Heavyweight Gzim Selmani. Thompson lost the fight via technical submission (guillotine choke).

Inoki Genome Federation
Thompson entered the Inoki Genome Federation (IGF) World Grand Prix for the vacant IGF Championship and fought in the Quarterfinal against Japanese legend Ikuhisa Minowa whom he defeated by Unanimous Decision at Inoki Genome Fight 3. Thompson next fought Chris Barnett in the Grand Prix semifinal at Inoki Genome Fight 4 to advance to the Championship match. Oli Thompson defeated Fernando Rodrigues, Jr by TKO in the first round to capture the 2015 IGF World GP and the IGF Championship.

Bellator MMA
In June 2016, it was announced that Thompson had signed with Bellator MMA.  He made his promotional debut against Matt Mitrione on 16 July 2016 at Bellator 158.  Thompson lost the back-and-forth fight via TKO in the second round.

In his second fight for the promotion, Thompson faced former training partner Cheick Kongo at Bellator 172 on 18 February 2017. He lost the fight by unanimous decision.

Post Bellator 
After going 4-2 fighting around the world, Thompson faced Sergei Kharitonov at MFP Parus Fight Championship on November 7, 2020. He lost the fight via first-round knockout.

After losing two bouts on the Croatian regional scene, Thompson faced Adam Wieczorek on September 24, 2022 at MMA Attack 4, losing via TKO stoppage in the third round.

Championships and accomplishments
Ultimate Challenge MMA
UCMMA Heavyweight Championship (one time)
Inoki Genome Federation
IGF Championship (one time, last)
2015 IGF World Grand Prix Championship
Road FC
 Road FC Heavyweight Championship (one time)
ZT Fight Night
 ZT Fight Night Heavyweight tournament finalist
Fight Exclusive Night
 FEN Heavyweight Championship (one time, current)

Mixed martial arts record

|-
|Loss
|align=center|21–16
|Adam Wieczorek
|TKO (punches)
|MMA Attack 4
|
|align=center| 3
|align=center| 2:13
|Będzin, Poland
|
|-
|Loss
|align=center| 21–15
|Ivan Vitasović
|KO (head kick)
|FNC 6
|
|align=center| 2
|align=center| 2:10
|Karlovac, Croatia
|
|-
| Loss
| align=center| 21–14
| Saša Milinković
| Decision (split)
| ARMAGEDON 2 FINALS
| 
| align=center| 3
| align=center| 5:00
| Osijek, Croatia
| 
|-
| Loss
| align=center| 21–13
| Sergei Kharitonov
| KO (punch)
| MFP Parus Fight Championship
| 
| align=center| 1
| align=center| 2:50
| Dubai, United Arab Emirates
| 
|-
|  Win
|align=center |21–12
| Szymon Bajor
| KO (punch)
|FEN 28
| 
|align=center|1
|align=center|0:23
|Lublin, Poland
|
|-
|  Loss
|align=center|20–12
| Ante Delija
| TKO (punches)
||KSW 51: Croatia
| 
|align=center|2
|align=center|1:58
|Zagreb, Croatia
|
|-
|-
|  Win
| align=center|20–11
| Kamil Bazelak
| TKO (knees and punches)
|Sparta Fight Series 4
| 
| align=center| 1
| align=center| N/A
| Eastbourne, England
|
|-
|-
|  Loss
| align=center|19–11
| Tarek Suleiman
| TKO (punches)
| UAE Warriors 1
| 
| align=center| 2
| align=center| 4:42
| Abu Dhabi, United Arab Emirates
|
|-
|-
|  Win
| align=center|19–10
| Roman Wehbe
| TKO (knees to the body)
| Abu Dhabi Warriors 5
| 
| align=center| 2
| align=center| 3:54
| Abu Dhabi, United Arab Emirates
|
|-
|-
|  Win
| align=center|18–10
| Chaolong Deng
| TKO (knees to the body)
| Road FC 047
| 
| align=center| 2
| align=center| 3:49
| Beijing, China
| 
|-
|  Loss
| align=center|17–10
| Cheick Kongo
| Decision (unanimous)
| Bellator 172
| 
| align=center| 3
| align=center| 5:00
| San Jose, California, United States
|
|-
| Loss
| align=center|17–9
| Matt Mitrione
| TKO (punches)
| Bellator 158
| 
| align=center| 2
| align=center| 4:21
| London, England
|
|-
| Win
| align=center|17–8
| Fernando Rodrigues Júnior
| TKO (punches)
| Inoki Bom-Ba-Ye 2015
| 
| align=center| 1
| align=center| 2:08
| Tokyo, Japan
| 
|-
| Win
| align=center|16–8
| Michal Wlodarek
| DQ (illegal knee)
| KSW 32
| 
| align=center| 3
| align=center| 1:42
| London, England
| 
|-
| Win
| align=center|15–8
| Chris Barnett
| Decision (unanimous)
| Inoki Genome Fight 4
| 
| align=center| 2
| align=center| 5:00
| Tokyo, Japan
| 
|-
| Win
| align=center|14–8
| Kamil Bazelak
| TKO (knee)
| Macto Championships: Osipczak vs. Redfearn
| 
| align=center| 1
| align=center| 3:06
| Milton Keynes, Buckinghamshire, England
| 
|-
| Win
| align=center|13–8
| Ikuhisa Minowa
| Decision (unanimous)
| Inoki Genome Fight 3
| 
| align=center| 2
| align=center| 5:00
| Tokyo, Japan
| 
|-
|  Loss
| align=center| 12–8
| Brett McDermott
| KO (punches)
| BAMMA 17
| 
| align=center|1
| align=center|1:43
| Manchester, England
| 
|-
|  Loss
| align=center| 12–7
| Mariusz Pudzianowski
| Decision (unanimous)
| KSW 27
| 
| align=center|2
| align=center|5:00
| Gdańsk, Poland
| 
|-
|  Loss
| align=center| 12–6
| Gzim Selmani
| Technical Submission (guillotine choke)
| BAMMA 15
| 
| align=center|1
| align=center|0:18
| London, England
| 
|-
|  Win
| align=center| 12–5
| Kamil Walus
| TKO (punches)
| KSW 25
| 
| align=center|2
| align=center|1:34
| Wroclaw, Poland
| 
|-
|  Win
| align=center| 11–5
| Kevin Asplund
| TKO (punches)
| GWC: The British Invasion: US vs. UK
| 
| align=center|1
| align=center|3:21
| Kansas City, Missouri, United States
| 
|-
|  Loss
| align=center| 10–5
| Karol Bedorf
| Decision (unanimous)
| KSW 22
| 
| align=center|3
| align=center|5:00
| Warsaw, Poland
| 
|-
|  Win
| align=center| 10–4
| Ivan Pioneer
| TKO (submission to punches)
| CSMMA: Ultimate Conflict 3
| 
| align=center|1
| align=center|0:45
| London, England
| 
|-
|  Loss
| align=center| 9–4
| Phil De Fries
| Submission (rear-naked choke)
| UFC on Fox: Shogun vs. Vera
| 
| align=center|2
| align=center|4:16
| Los Angeles, California, United States
| 
|-
|  Loss
| align=center| 9–3
| Shawn Jordan
| TKO (knee and punches)
| UFC on FX: Alves vs. Kampmann
| 
| align=center|2
| align=center|1:07
| Sydney, Australia
| 
|-
|  Win
| align=center| 9–2
| Mark Potter
| Submission (rear-naked choke)
| UCMMA 21: Stand Your Ground
| 
| align=center|1
| align=center|2:55
| London, England
| 
|-
| Win
| align=center| 8–2
| Ben Smith
| Submission (rear-naked choke)
| UCMMA 19: Lights Out
| 
| align=center| 2
| align=center| 3:44
| London, England
| 
|-
| Win
| align=center| 7–2
| Nikki Kent
| TKO (punches)
| ZTFN: Enter the Octagon
| 
| align=center| 1
| align=center| N/A
| Hove, East Sussex
| 
|-
| Win
| align=center| 6–2
| Tomasz Czerwinski
| Submission (rear-naked choke)
| ZTFN: Stand Your Ground
| 
| align=center| 1
| align=center| N/A
| Eastbourne, East Sussex
| 
|-
| Win
| align=center| 5–2
| Ian Hawkins
| Decision (unanimous)
| UCMMA 13: Feel the Pain
| 
| align=center| 3
| align=center| 5:00
| London, England
| 
|-
| Loss
| align=center| 4–2
| Rob Broughton
| Decision (unanimous)
| ZT Fight Night: Heavyweights Collide
| 
| align=center| 3
| align=center| 5:00
| Hove, England
| 
|-
| Loss
| align=center| 4–1
| Joe Vedepo
| TKO (punches)
| ZT Fight Night: Heavyweights Collide
| 
| align=center| 2
| align=center| 1:24
| Hove, England
| 
|-
| Win
| align=center| 4–0
| Steve Day
| KO (punch)
| ZT Fight Night: Heavyweights Collide
| 
| align=center| 1
| align=center| 1:07
| Hove, England
| 
|-
| Win
| align=center| 3–0
| Tomasz Kamienczyk
| TKO (punches)
| ZT Fight Night: Night of Champions
| 
| align=center| 1
| align=center| N/A
| Hove, England
| 
|-
| Win
| align=center| 2–0
| Ashley Pollard
| TKO (submission to punches)
| ZT Fight Night 16: The Heat is on
| 
| align=center| 1
| align=center| 2:19
| Hove, England
| 
|-
| Win
| align=center| 1–0
| Ashley Pollard
| Submission (arm-triangle choke)
| ZT Fight Night 15
| 
| align=center| 2
| align=center| N/A
| Hove, England
|

References

External links
UFC Profile
IFSA Strongman rankings
Pro Muscle Mag interview
Sherdog MMA Profile
 Oli Thompson from UFC Fans

1980 births
English strength athletes
Living people
English male mixed martial artists
Heavyweight mixed martial artists
Ultimate Fighting Championship male fighters